Sonha may refer to:
 Sonha language, an Indo-Aryan language
 Sonha Station, a railway station in North Korea

See also 
 Sohna